Güven may refer to:

Given name
 Aydın Güven Gürkan (1941 – 2006), academician and politician
 Güven Çavuş (born 1993), Turkish footballer
 Güven Güneri (born 1987), Turkish footballer
 Güven Gürsoy (born 1992), Turkish footballer
 Güven Hokna (born 1946), Turkish actress
 Güven Kıraç (born 1960), Turkish actor
 Güven Önüt (1940 – 2003), Turkish footballer
 Güven Sak (born 1961), Turkish economist and academic
 Güven Sazak (1935 – 2011), Turkish politician
 Güven Varol (born 1981), Turkish footballer
 Güven Yalcin Turkish footballer

Surname
 Ayhancan Güven (born 1998), Turkish racing driver
 Azmiye Hami Güven (1904 – 1954), Turkish novelist
 Adem Güven (born 1985), Turkish-Norwegian footballer
 Banu Güven (born 1969), Turkish journalist
 Burak Güven (born 1975), Turkish musician
 Egemen Güven (born 1996), Turkish basketball player
 Erhan Güven (born 1982), Turkish footballer
 Ferhat Güven (born 1983), Norwegian politician
 Halil Güven, Cypriot-born professor and the rector of Istanbul Bilgi University
 Leyla Güven (born 1964), Turkish politician
 Mehmet Güven (born 1987), Turkish footballer
 Ozan Güven (born 1975), Turkish film, TV series and theatre actor

Place
 Güven Park, an urban public park located in Ankara, Turkey
 Güven, Düzce

Turkish-language surnames
Turkish masculine given names